The 2011 Waterford Senior Hurling Championship was the 111th staging of the Waterford Senior Hurling Championship since its establishment by the Waterford County Board in 1897.

De La Salle were the defending champions.

On 16 October 2011, Ballygunner won the championship after a 1-19 to 0-06 defeat of Tallow in the final. This was their 12th championship title overall and their first title since 2009.

Results

Final

References

Waterford Senior Hurling Championship
Waterford Senior Hurling Championship